Arseni Markov (born 12 November 1981) is a former competitive ice dancer who competed internationally for Canada and Russia. With Chantal Lefebvre, he is the 2004 and 2005 Canadian national bronze medalist. With earlier partner Svetlana Kulikova, he is the 2001 Winter Universiade bronze medalist and 2002 Skate Canada International bronze medalist.

Career 
Markov competed as a singles skater for Russia until he was 13 years old. He teamed up with Svetlana Kulikova in 1996. They placed 6th at the 2000 World Junior Championships. Following the 2000–2001 season, Kulikova and Markov moved to Newington, Connecticut, to train full-time with Tatiana Tarasova and Nikolai Morozov. They won the bronze medal at the 2002 Skate Canada International. They parted ways after the 2003 Russian Championships as a result of Tarasova and Morozov ending their coaching partnership – Kulikova chose to stay with Tarasova while Markov chose Morozov.

Markov moved to Canada and teamed up with Canadian Chantal Lefebvre in 2003. However, he was unable to compete internationally for Canada until 2005 because ISU regulations require a two-year wait when changing countries. In their first season competing internationally, Lefebvre and Markov placed 4th at the 2006 Four Continents. They won two Canadian national bronze medals. After the 2005–06 season, they changed coaches from Nikolai Morozov and Shae-Lynn Bourne to Elise Hamel and Tyler Myles.

Lefebvre and Markov announced their retirement from competitive skating on 20 July 2007. They began careers in coaching and choreography.

Programs

With Lefebvre

With Kulikova

Results
GP: Grand Prix; JGP: Junior Grand Prix

With Lefebvre

With Kulikova

References

External links 

 
 
 Official site
 Skate Canada profile

Canadian male ice dancers
Russian male ice dancers
1981 births
Living people
Figure skaters from Moscow
Universiade medalists in figure skating
Universiade bronze medalists for Russia
Competitors at the 2001 Winter Universiade